Beste may refer to:

Given name
Beste Bereket (born 1982), Turkish actress
Beste Kaynakçı (born 1994), Turkish female yacht racer
Beste Kökdemir  (born 1993), Turkish actress

Surname
Henry Digby Beste  (1768–1836), English writer and aristocrat

Other uses
Beste (Turkish music), a vocal genre in Ottoman classical music
Beste (river), a river in Schleswig-Holstein, northern Germany
Knutsen & Ludvigsens Beste, a hits album

See also
Bester (disambiguation)
Bestor
Best (surname)

Surnames from given names